Gurudongmar Lake is one of the highest lakes in the world and in India, at an elevation of  according to the Government of Sikkim. It is located in the Great Himalayas in the Mangan District in  Indian state of Sikkim, and considered sacred by Buddhists, Sikhs and Hindus. The lake is named after Guru Padmasambhava—also known as Guru Rinpoche—founder of Tibetan Buddhism, who visited in the 8th century.

Geography

The lake can be reached by road from Lachen via Thangu Valley. The road from Thangu to Gurudongmar passes through rugged terrain with moraine, which has high alpine pastures covered with many rhododendron trees. While Indian tourists are allowed to visit the lake, foreigners need to get a special permit from the Ministry of Home Affairs in New Delhi.

Features

The lake, fed by glaciers, is located to the north of the Kanchendzonga range, in a high plateau area connected with the Tibetan Plateau. It provides one of the source streams which joins the Tso Lahmu and then form the source of the Teesta River. The lake remains completely frozen in the winter months, from November to Mid-May.

However, the size of the lake appears small at the place where the devotees offer worship because the larger part of the lake is not visible due to hilly topography obstructing the view. The area surrounding the lake, also known as Gurudongmar, is inhabited by yaks, blue sheep and other wildlife of high altitude.

The lake is fresh water and used to be very clear; the bed of the lake could even be seen from the middle of the lake. Pollution has muddied the waters in recent years, and the lake has taken on a white tinge and has obscured visibility.

In folklore

A legend related to the frozen condition of the lake is linked to the visit of Guru Padmasambhava to the lake, on his way back from Tibet. When he saw it, he felt that it was worthy of veneration, as it represented the divine location of Dorje Nyima or Chhoedten Nyima. Because the lake remained frozen most of the year with no possibility of providing for drinking water needs, the people of the area appealed to Padmasambhva to help them. The guru agreed to help and placed his hands on a small part of the lake area, which stopped freezing during winter, facilitating drinking water to the people. Since then, the lake has been considered sacred and devotees carry this sacred water in containers.

According to another legend, when Padmasambhava visited the lake he saw an auspicious phenomenon and then he considered it a good augury to enter the mainland of Sikkim, then known as Demojong.

Dispute

A dispute arose when on the bank of the lake an Indian Army regiment of Sikhs—located at the border with China—considering the lake as the place visited by their saint Guru Nanak, constructed a Gurudwara in 1997–1998. This created anger among the Sikkimese people of the area, who considered the Gurudwara an illegal construction, because their ancient sacred lake had been sanctified by the visit of their Guru Padmasambhava. The government of Sikkim then constituted a high level committee to examine the issue and submit a report. Documents furnished to the committee by the Namgyal Institute of Tibetology, Gangtok, agreed with the claim of the local people that it was without a doubt a Buddhist religious place. This was accepted by the committee. The building constructed by the Sikh regiment was then handed over by the Army to the Lachen Monastery on 6 July 2001, in the presence of the Sub Divisional Magistrate, Chungthang, North Sikkim. The monastery placed a lama as a watchman at the lake, entrusted with the task of maintaining it.

Images

See also

 Tourism in North East India
 Tilicho lake
 Lake Tsongmo
 Khecheopalri Lake
 Sanglaphu

Notes

References

External links

Gurudongmar lake Travel Guide
 Gurudongmar Lake- Permit Regulations Climate Temperature Height

China–India border
Mangan district
Sacred lakes of Sikkim
Tourism in Northeast India